The Arys (Arys) is a river of southern Kazakhstan and a right tributary of the Syr Darya.

The highest runoff is in April during snow melt, the lowest  is in August. The river is used for irrigation to grow rice in the lower reaches. The largest tributaries are the Mashat, Aksu, Boralday and the Badam.

The Arys has been populated by humans since ancient times, and was located to the north of the Silk Road. Numerous medieval castles, of which the most significant is Otrar, is located in the area.

References

Tributaries of the Syr Darya
Rivers of Kazakhstan